Journey is an album performed by multi-instrumentalist Joe McPhee's Trio X recorded in 2002 and first released on the CIMP label.

Reception

Allmusic reviewer Steve Loewy states "you could not ask for a more accomplished, in-synch set of musical partners. There is a near-perfect synergy among them, so much so that they seem to anticipate each other's every move, almost like dancers who instinctively follow one another's steps". On All About Jazz Florence Wetzel wrote "although one can listen to Journey with half an ear, its greatest rewards come from attention and complete immersion. Certainly Trio-X is worth the effort".

Track listing 
All compositions by Joe McPhee, Dominic Duval and Jay Rosen
 "Episode 1: That Was/This Is" - 6:10
 "Episode 2: Journey"  - 11:58
 "Episode 3: Jaywalkin'" - 9:19
 "Episode 4: Blue Moves" - 6:56
 "Episode 5: Autograph" - 12:18
 "Episode 6: Everything In Nothing Flat" - 6:02
 "Episode 7: For Charles Moffett" - 3:04
 "Episode 8: Rossie 2 Step" - 5:16
 "Episode 9: Albert's Alto" - 4:40
 "Episode 10: Amazing Grace" - 4:54

Personnel 
Joe McPhee - alto saxophone, tenor saxophone 
Dominic Duval - bass
Jay Rosen - drums

References 

Trio X albums
2002 albums
CIMP albums